Rhipicephalus appendiculatus, the brown ear tick, is a hard tick found in Africa where it spreads the parasite Theileria parva, the cause of East Coast fever in cattle. The tick has a three-host life-cycle, spending around 10% of its life feeding on animals. The most common host species include buffalo, cattle, and large antelope, but R. appendiculatus is also found on other animals, such as hares, dogs, and warthogs.

Rhipicephalus appendiculatus is found in the center, east and south-east of Africa, in areas with at least  of rainfall each year.

References

Ixodidae
Animals described in 1901